Anna Falchi (born Anna Kristiina Palomäki on 22 April 1972) is a Finnish-Italian model and film actress.

Career 
Anna Kristiina Palomäki was born in Tampere, Finland, the daughter of an Italian father, Benito (Tito) Falchi, and Finnish mother Kaarina. She has a brother, Saro, and a half-brother in Sweden, Peter (by her father). In 1978, at the age of six, she moved to Italy with her family, where she started her career as a model. Falchi first appeared on television in a commercial for an Italian bank in 1992. The ad starred Paolo Villaggio, and was directed by the celebrated Federico Fellini. This helped her launch a film career, starting with Nel continente nero (in the black Continent) in 1993.

Falchi appeared in many films since, including the 1994 fantasy movie The Dragon Ring, the 1997 film La principessa e il povero and the 2005 comedy Nessun messaggio in segreteria. She has also been a popular television personality, hosting various specials on Italian television.

Falchi is lesser known in the English-speaking world. Some know her for the lead female role in the film Dellamorte Dellamore, which was released in the US as Cemetery Man.

In a 2001, Falchi was a guest on the Italian late-night show Satyricon, during which she satirized one of the appearances of Madonna on Late Show with David Letterman during which Madonna jokingly teased Letterman for refusing to smell her panties. Falchi actually took off her red panties on stage, and the host, Daniele Luttazzi, went all the way to smell them, which caused some scandal in Italy.

Filmography 
 Nel continente nero (1993)
 Anni 90: Parte II (1993)
 S.P.Q.R.: 2,000 and a Half Years Ago (1994)
 Miracolo italiano (1994)
 C'è Kim Novak al telefono (1994)
 Cemetery Man (1994)
 L'affaire (1994)
 Palla di neve (1995)
 Celluloide (1995)
 Giovani e belli (1996)
 Paparazzi (1998)
 Body Guards (2000)
 Gli occhi dell'amore (2001)
 Operazione Rosmarino (2001)
 Nessun messaggio in segreteria (2005)
 Bambini (2006)
 L'allenatore nel pallone 2 (2008)
 Un'estate al mare (2008)
 Ce n'è per tutti (2009)
 L'uomo nero (2009)
 Box Office 3D: The Filmest of Films (2011)
 I milionari (2013)

References

External links 
 
 
 
 

1972 births
Living people
Italian female models
Finnish female models
Italian film actresses
Finnish people of Italian descent
actresses from Tampere
Italian people of Finnish descent
20th-century Italian actresses
21st-century Italian actresses